Perlamantis is a genus of praying mantids in the family Amorphoscelidae. Species records are from Northern Africa and the Iberian peninsula.

Species 
The following two species are recognised in the genus Perlamantis:
 Perlamantis algerica Giglio-Tos, 1914
 Perlamantis alliberti Guerin-Meneville, 1843 - type species

References

External links 
 
 

Amorphoscelidae
Mantodea genera
Africa|Europe
Mantodea of Africa